Aynan is a sub-district located in al-Sabrah District, Ibb Governorate, Yemen. Aynan had a population of 6830 according to the 2004 census.

References 

Sub-districts in As Sabrah District